Giran may refer to:

 Giran County, a county in Taiwan
 Giran City, capital of the Taiwanese county of the same name
 Giran (film), an Egyptian film
 Giran (My Hero Academia), a character in the manga series My Hero Academia